Impurity after childbirth is the religious or cultural belief that a new mother is in a state of uncleanliness or pollution, requiring ritual purification. It is connected to the seclusion imposed by the expectations of postpartum confinement, and more broadly to the taboos around menstruation and bleeding.

Biblical law on impurity after childbirth 
According to Leviticus 12, a woman who gives birth to a son remains impure for a week, and afterwards immerses in a body of water to purify herself. In the rabbinical interpretation of Leviticus 12, any subsequent blood she sees over the next 33 days would be considered dam tohar (דַּם טׂוהַר – ritually clean blood), and that blood does not prohibit her from sexual relations with her husband. The law for a woman who gives birth to a daughter is the same, however, the durations are doubled. The mother becomes impure for 2 weeks, and after immersion, any blood she sees over the next 66 days is dam tohar.

Scholarly explanation 
There is no scholarly consensus for the Biblical law, including the difference between the birth of sons and daughters. Tikva Frymer-Kensky suggested that "like the person who touched death, the person who has experienced birth has been at the boundaries of life/non-life...."

Other rationales include moments of crisis or danger, fear of demons, health, and a lack of wholeness.

Jewish law and practices 
Within the realm of Biblical law and post-Biblical Jewish religious discourse surrounding tumah and taharah, the impurity is called in Hebrew tumat yoledet. Halakhah treats a yoledet (woman who gives birth) similarly to any woman with niddah status.

In some Jewish communities, ceremonies and a degree of seclusion were applied to postparturient women. For example, there was a Sana Yemenite custom of women visiting the mother during 4–6 weeks after childbirth. The mother would be visited in a special room in her home and she would sit in a decorated triangle box.

Christian practices 
Some early churches followed the Jewish custom of restricting women from worship after giving birth until the purification ceremony. Today, many Christians commemorate Candlemas, the feast of the purification of the Virgin Mary. Some continue to celebrate a Churching of Women ceremony, derived from the Jewish tradition but not necessarily implicating ritual impurity.

Hinduism
In Hinduism, Sutak is impurity associated with birth of a child. After childbirth, pollution period of eleven days is observed.

Sikhism
Sutak is a Hindu belief associated with the impurity of the house on account of the birth of a child. It is also believed that women are most prone to such impurity. Guru Nanak condemned such notions of pollution/impurity.

See also
 Menstrual taboo
 Postpartum depression

References 

 
 Goldberg, Harvey E. Jewish passages: cycles of Jewish life. Univ of California Press, 2003.
 Magonet, Jonathan. "‘But If It Is a Girl, She Is Unclean for Twice Seven Days...’: The Riddle of Leviticus 12: 5." Reading Leviticus: A Conversation with Mary Douglas (1996): 144-52.
 Tikva Frymer-Kensky, “Pollution, Purification, and Purgation in Biblical Israel,” in The Word of the Lord Shall Go Forth: Essays in Honor of D. N. Freedman in Celebration of His Sixtieth Birthday (ed. C. L. Meyers and M. O’Connor; Winona Lake, Ind.: Eisenbrauns, 1983), 399–414

Jewish ritual purity law
Childbirth
Mitzvoth
Blood
Ritual purification